Union Township is one of eleven townships in Randolph County, Indiana, which contains the towns of Modoc and Losantville.  As of the 2010 census, its population was 2,142 and it contained 960 housing units.

History
Union Township was established in 1838 from the merger of Nettle Creek Township and West River Township.

Geography

Cities and towns
 Losantville
 Modoc

Unincorporated towns
 Huntsville at 
 Scott Corner at 
 Unionport at 
(This list is based on USGS data and may include former settlements.)

Cemeteries
Union Township has nine cemeteries:
Buena Vista Cemetery
Huntsville Cemetery
Little Creek Cemetery
Nettle Creek Baptist Cemetery
Riverside Cemetery
Salem Cemetery
Scott Cemetery
Union Baptist Cemetery
Union Chapel Cemetery

Major highways
 U.S. Route 36
 U.S. Route 35
 Indiana State Road 1

References

External links
 Indiana Township Association
 United Township Association of Indiana

Townships in Randolph County, Indiana
Townships in Indiana